Nial William Fulton is an Australian film and television producer, director and writer. Focused on social justice issues, his works include investigative documentaries Revelation, Hitting Home, Borderland, The Queen & Zak Grieve and Firestarter. In 2013 Fulton co-founded Sydney-based independent production company In Films with Ivan O'Mahoney.

Career 
Fulton worked with the Screen Ireland and Northern Ireland Screen on co-productions, features and television drama. After moving to Australia in 2004, he developed and produced a slate of productions for international broadcasters, including BBC, Channel 4, ABC, RTÉ, National Geographic Channel, Discovery Channel, Arte, France 5, SBS and Al Jazeera. 

Between 2010 and 2014 Fulton developed and produced two ABC Television drama specials, both filmed on location in Tasmania. The Last Confession of Alexander Pearce (2010) starring Adrian Dunbar and Ciaran McMenamin was nominated in the Best Drama category at the Irish Film and Television Awards and the Rose d'Or Awards. The Outlaw Michael Howe (2014) starring Damon Herriman and Rarriwuy Hick and directed by Brendan Cowell, told the true story of a convict-outlaw who led a rebellion against the British authorities in Van Diemen's Land.

In 2013, Fulton joined forces with film-maker Ivan O'Mahoney to create In Films, an independent production company specialising in social justice documentaries and fact-based drama. Their first collaboration was the critically acclaimed Borderland, one of three original series chosen to launch the Al Jazeera America network.
In 2016, the company was nominated for the Screen Producers Australia Breakthrough Business of the Year. Fulton won the Walkley Documentary Award with Sarah Ferguson and Ivan O'Mahoney for their work on the critically acclaimed ABC series Hitting Home. 

Between 2018 and 2020, Fulton directed and produced Revelation, a three part series with Sarah Ferguson on clerical abuse in the Catholic Church in Australia. The series took out the Walkley Documentary Award, the second time Fulton and Ferguson have won the award. In 2021, Fulton and Ferguson were nominated by the Australian Directors' Guild for their work on Revelation. 

In 2020, Fulton was asked to assist the New Zealand Royal Commission of Inquiry Into Abuse in Care and began working closely with the Inquiry investigators. Their work was focused on the Catholic religious institution Brothers Hospitallers of Saint John of God and the sexual abuse of vulnerable children in their institutions in Christchurch. During Revelation, Fulton and his production team interviewed Brother Bernard McGrath, one of the Order's most notorious sex offenders, and provided the Inquiry with evidence the leadership of St John of God had knowingly concealed child sex abuse allegations from police and protected sex offenders within their ranks. In February 2022, Judge Coral Shaw, Chairwoman of The Royal Commission of Inquiry into Abuse in Care, recognised Fulton's work for the Commission, personally thanking him on the final day of public hearings.

Filmography, awards and nominations

References

External links 
 
 
 Revelation Podcast

Irish film producers
Australian television producers
Irish television producers
Journalists from Northern Ireland
People educated at Portora Royal School
Alumni of Queen's University Belfast
People from Enniskillen
Living people
Walkley Award winners
Walkley Award winners, Australian
Walkley Award winners, Australian
Australian people of Irish descent
Film directors from Northern Ireland
Year of birth missing (living people)